Thomas Conrad von Baldenstein (14 September 1784 – 28 January 1878) was a Swiss naturalist.

Conrad von Baldenstein was an ornithologist, entomologist and apiarist. He produced a number of scientific works on the birdlife of the Alps, and was the first to describe the willow tit.

References

1784 births
1878 deaths
Swiss nobility
Swiss ornithologists
Swiss beekeepers
19th-century Swiss zoologists